Alexander McKee ( – 15 January 1799) was an American-born military officer and colonial official in the British Indian Department during the French and Indian War, the American Revolutionary War, and the Northwest Indian War. He achieved the rank of Deputy Superintendent General in 1794, the second highest position in the British Indian Department at the time.

Biography 
Alexander McKee was born about 1735, the second son of Thomas McKee an Irish immigrant (probably Scots-Irish from northern Ireland), fur trader, Indian Agent, and interpreter for General Forbes at Fort Pitt, and Nonhelema Hokolesqua (c. 1718–1786), an 18th century Shawnee leader and sister of Chief Cornstalk. McKee developed a lifelong relationship with the Ohio Indian tribes.

As a young man, Alexander McKee began working with traders who did business with the Indians of the Ohio Country. Soon, he was able to establish his own trading business. Because of his good relations with the Ohio tribes, Indian agent George Croghan enlisted McKee in the service of the Crown's Indian Department. Around 1764, McKee settled in what is now McKees Rocks, Pennsylvania, and built a substantial house. George Washington visited him there in 1770, and mentions this in his diary. McKee continued in the service of Pennsylvania for some time after the outbreak of the American Revolutionary War.

Around 1768 or 1769, McKee married a woman in a Shawnee village on the Ohio River. Her identity is unknown; she may have been a Shawnee woman, or possibly a white captive named Charlotte Brown who had been raised among the Shawnees. They had a son, Thomas McKee.

Following mistreatment by the settlers, he left the Americans in favor of the British at Detroit. It was during this transition that he established his well-known association with Matthew Elliott and the Girty brothers: Simon, James, and George.

During the next 25 years, Alexander McKee led efforts to promote the alliance of the Indians with the British, most especially with the Shawnee, but also with the majority of the Northwest Indian tribes.  He guarded the interests of the Indians and was their honest friend.  The Continental Congress branded him a traitor for remaining loyal to the British Empire and organizing several tribes on the side of the British.
"Alexander McKee, the British Indian Agent, who resided at the Machachac towns, on Mad River, during the incursion of General Logan from Kentucky in 1786, was obliged to flee with his effects. He had a large lot of swine, which were driven on to the borders of this stream, and when the Indians (Shawnee) came on they called the river Koshko Sepe, which in the Shawnee language signified 'The Creek of the Hogs, or Hog Stream'."

McKee negotiated several treaties on behalf of the British authorities with the Indigenous First Nations of Upper Canada in the Detroit area. This included Treaty 2 or "McKee's Purchase", which surrendered a large part of what is now South-western Ontario.

Legacy 

McKee died in Upper Canada in 1799. He was mourned and greatly honored by the Northwest tribes. His son Thomas McKee was a Canadian soldier and political figure.

The borough of McKees Rocks, Pennsylvania, is the site of Alexander McKee's original  land grant, which the agent was awarded on 25 November 1764, by Colonel Bouquet. The McKee plantation was called FairView. George Washington dined at Fairview in 1770, and the eight-room log mansion was mentioned by George Washington in his journal. The home was razed by the Pittsburgh and Lake Erie Railroad in 1902.

References 

Nelson, Larry L. A Man of Distinction Among Them. Alexander McKee and British-Indian Affairs along the Ohio Country Frontier 1754-1799. Kent, OH: The Kent State University Press, 1999.

External links
 Biography at the Dictionary of Canadian Biography Online
 A Short Biography
 Alexander McKee
Alexander McKee Papers, Special Collections at The University of Southern Mississippi (de Grummond Children's Literature Collection)

1799 deaths
British Indian Department
Colonial American Indian agents
Canadian fur traders
Canadian people of Irish descent
People of the Northwest Indian War
Year of birth uncertain
1735 births